The 2016 Sparks Energy 300 was the ninth stock car race of the 2016 NASCAR Xfinity Series season, and the 25th iteration of the event. The race was held on Saturday, April 30, 2016, in Lincoln, Alabama, at Talladega Superspeedway, a 2.66 miles (4.28 km) permanent triangular-shaped superspeedway. The race was increased from 113 laps to 116 laps, due to a NASCAR overtime finish. In a wild finish that sparked controversy, Elliott Sadler, driving for JR Motorsports, would spin Brad Keselowski on the final lap, and earned his 11th career NASCAR Xfinity Series win, and his first of the season. To fill out the podium, Justin Allgaier, driving for JR Motorsports, and Brennan Poole, driving for Chip Ganassi Racing, would finish second and third, respectively.

The race would bring controversy on the final lap. Elliott Sadler would get Joey Logano loose in turn four, causing Logano to slide down the racetrack and hit Sadler. He would then ricochet up the racetrack, and Blake Koch, with nowhere to go, would slam into the side of Logano, making Logano go airborne. Ultimately, Brennan Poole would cross the line first, in a photo finish with Justin Allgaier. Since the caution came out before the field took the checkered flag, NASCAR reviewed the running positions when it flew. Elliott Sadler would be the official winner, since he was the driver that was leading when the caution came out. Allgaier and Poole would be credited with second and third place, respectively.

Background 

Talladega Superspeedway, nicknamed “'Dega”, and formerly named Alabama International Motor Speedway (AIMS) from 1969 to 1989, is a motorsports complex located north of Talladega, Alabama. It is located on the former Anniston Air Force Base in the small city of Lincoln. A tri-oval, the track was constructed in 1969 by the International Speedway Corporation, a business controlled by the France Family. , the track hosts the NASCAR Cup Series, NASCAR Xfinity Series, NASCAR Camping World Truck Series, and ARCA Menards Series. The total peak capacity of Talladega is around 175,000 spectators, with the main grandstand capacity being about 80,000.

Entry list 

 (R) denotes rookie driver.
 (i) denotes driver who is ineligible for series driver points.

Practice

First practice 
The first practice session was held on Friday, April 29, at 10:30 AM CST. The session would last for 55 minutes.

Final practice 
The final practice session was held on Friday, April 29, at 12:30 PM CST.

Qualifying 
Qualifying was held on Saturday, April 30, at 9:30 AM CST. Since Talladega Superspeedway is at least , the qualifying system was a single car, single lap, two round system where in the first round, everyone would set a time to determine positions 13-40. Then, the fastest 12 qualifiers would move on to the second round to determine positions 1-12.

Josh Reaume, Derrike Cope, and Mike Harmon would fail to qualify.

Full qualifying results

Race results

Standings after the race 

Drivers' Championship standings

Note: Only the first 12 positions are included for the driver standings.

References 

2016 NASCAR Xfinity Series
NASCAR races at Talladega Superspeedway
2016 Sparks Energy 300
2016 in sports in Alabama